Nivetica nervosa is a moth of the family Noctuidae. It is only found in New Zealand. This species can be found in wetland habitat in the alpine zone of the South Island. It is a small, distinctively patterned moth that is attracted to light. Currently much of its biology and life cycle is unknown. Adults are on the wing in January and February.

Taxonomy
This species was first described by George Vernon Hudson in 1922 from a specimen collected on Bold Peak, Lake Wakatipu by F. S. Oliver on the night of December 1910. Hudson originally named the species Icheutica nervosa. Hudson discussed and illustrated this species under that same name in his 1928 publication The butterflies and moths of New Zealand. In 1988 John S. Dugdale also discussed this species under the name Ichneutica nervosa.  However in 2019 Robert J. B. Hoare published a paper in which he undertook a major review of New Zealand noctuids. Hoare, having inspected specimens of this species, placed it within the newly described genus Nivetica. As at 2019, the location of the male holotype is unknown.

Description

Hudson originally described the species as follows:

The adult male moth has a wingspan of 28—32mm while the female's wingspan is slightly larger at 35mm.

Geographic range 
N. nervosa is endemic to New Zealand and the species is widespread in the alpine zone of the South Island.

Habitat 
This species prefers alpine wetland habitat.

Host species
The host species of this moth are unknown.

Life history 
Little is known of the life history of this species of moth however the adults of N. nervosa are on the wing in December and January.

References

Moths described in 1922
Hadeninae
Moths of New Zealand
Endemic fauna of New Zealand
Taxa named by George Hudson
Endemic moths of New Zealand